Milešovka is with its 837 m the highest mountain of České Středohoří, Czech Republic. The height difference between the foot and summit is 300 metres. Alexander von Humboldt claimed the view to be the third nicest view in the world.

Climate
Milešovka is at an altitude of 837 metres above sea level and therefore has a pronounced alpine climate. This results in the average temperature in the region being three to four degrees Celsius cooler than Prague.

References 

Mountains and hills of the Czech Republic
Litoměřice District